Leonardo Adrián Villagra Enciso (born 2 September 1990) is a Paraguayan professional footballer who plays as a forward.

References

External links
 
 Ascenso MX 

Living people
1990 births
People from Central Department
Paraguayan footballers
Association football forwards
Liga MX players